Khemraj Ramjattan (born 12 October 1960) is a Guyanese politician and one of the founders of Alliance for Change.

From May 2015 to August 2020, he served as Minister of Public Security and one of the vice presidents in the cabinet of David A. Granger.

Ramjattan was born in No. 48 Village, East Berbice-Corentyne. He is an attorney-at-law, and has degrees from University of the West Indies at Cave Hill and Hugh Wooding Law School. He was elected to the National Assembly of Guyana in 1992 when he was a member of People's Progressive Party.

References

1960 births
Living people
Guyanese people of Indian descent
Alliance for Change (Guyana) politicians
Vice presidents of Guyana
Government ministers of Guyana
Members of the National Assembly (Guyana)
20th-century Guyanese lawyers
People's Progressive Party (Guyana) politicians
University of the West Indies alumni